The Elias Bassalygo bound is a mathematical limit used in coding theory for error correction during data transmission or communications.

Definition 

 

Let  be the volume of the Hamming ball of radius . It is obvious that the volume of a Hamming Ball is translation-invariant, i.e. indifferent to  In particular, 

With large enough , the rate  and the relative distance  satisfy the Elias-Bassalygo bound: 

  

where

 

is the q-ary entropy function and 

  

is a function related with Johnson bound.

Proof 
To prove the Elias–Bassalygo bound, start with the following Lemma:

Lemma.
 
codewords in it.

Proof of Lemma. Since  is (uniform) randomly selected the expected size of overlapped region  is 
 
Since this is the expected value of the size, there must exist at least one  such that 

otherwise the expectation must be smaller than this value.

Now we prove the Elias–Bassalygo bound. Define  By Lemma, there exists a Hamming ball with  codewords such that:

By the Johnson bound, we have . Thus,  

 

The second inequality follows from lower bound on the volume of a Hamming ball:

Therefore we have

See also 

 Singleton bound
 Hamming bound
 Plotkin bound
 Gilbert–Varshamov bound
 Johnson bound

References

Coding theory
Articles containing proofs